Dunărea Stadium is a multi-use stadium in Zimnicea. It is the home ground of Dunărea Zimnicea. Its capacity is of 2,000 people.

Football venues in Romania